The men's national under-17 basketball team of the Philippines represents the country in junior men's under-16 and under-17 FIBA tournaments and is governed by the Samahang Basketbol ng Pilipinas. The team is currently being handled by Joshua Vincent Reyes.

Current roster
Philippines roster at the 2022 FIBA Under-17 Basketball World Cup:

Competitions

FIBA U-17 Basketball World Cup

FIBA Asia U-16 Championship

SEABA U-16 Championship

Past rosters

2018 FIBA Under-17 Basketball World Cup
Philippines roster at the 2018 FIBA Under-17 Basketball World Cup:

2018 FIBA Under-16 Asian Championship
Philippines roster at the 5th FIBA Under-16 Asian Championship:

2017 SEABA Under-16 Championship
Philippines roster at the 4th SEABA Under-16 Championship:

2015 FIBA Asia Under-16 Championship
Philippines roster at the 4th FIBA Asia Under-16 Championship:

2015 SEABA Under-16 Championship
Philippines roster at the 3rd SEABA Under-16 Championship:

2014 FIBA Under-17 World Championship
Philippines roster at the 3rd FIBA Under-17 World Championship:

2013 FIBA Asia Under-16 Championship
Philippines roster at the 3rd FIBA Asia Under-16 Championship:

2013 SEABA Under-16 Championship
Philippines roster at the 2nd SEABA Under-16 Championship:

2011 FIBA Asia Under-16 Championship
Philippines roster at the 2nd FIBA Asia Under-16 Championship:

2011 SEABA Under-16 Championship
Philippines roster at the 1st SEABA Under-16 Championship:

2009 FIBA Asia Under-16 Championship
Philippines roster at the 1st FIBA Asia Under-16 Championship:

References

External links
Samahang Basketbol ng Pilipinas Official Website

under
Men's national under-17 basketball teams